The Västergötland class of diesel-electric submarines entered service in 1987 in the Swedish Navy allowing the last Draken II class of subs to be retired.

History 
The original four ships of the class (Västergötland, Hälsingland, Södermanland, and Östergötland) were built between 1983 and 1988 by Kockums AB. The latter two have undergone comprehensive refits, including the insertion of a new hull section with an air-independent propulsion system equipped with Stirling engines. They have been recommissioned in 2003–2004 as the new .

They were refitted to Södermanland class standards and received additional climatisation for use in tropical waters, and relaunched in 2009–2010.

Units

See also
 List of submarine classes in service
  - enlarged versions of Västergötland used by the Royal Australian Navy
 List of active Swedish Navy ships

References 

 
Submarine classes
Naval ships of Sweden
Submarines of Sweden